Trude von Molo (22 December 1906 – 27 November 1989) was an Austrian film actress. She was the daughter of the writer Walter von Molo and the twin sister of Conrad von Molo. Von Molo attended the Max Reinhardt training school. She emerged as a leading actress of German cinema in the early 1930s, but then retired and emigrated to Latin America.

Her American debut was in the film, The Theft of the Mona Lisa (1931), when the German-made film played in the United States.

Selected filmography
 Ludwig II, King of Bavaria (1929)
 The Theft of the Mona Lisa (1931)
 The Man Who Murdered (1931)
 The White Demon (1932)
 The Invisible Front (1932)
 The Marathon Runner (1933)

References

Bibliography
 Youngkin, Stephen. The Lost One: A Life of Peter Lorre. University Press of Kentucky, 2005.
 

https://www.trudevonmolo-artistepeintredegenrefeminin.com

1906 births
1989 deaths
Austrian film actresses
Actresses from Vienna
20th-century Austrian actresses